Labyrinth is a 1980 adventure video game published by Med Systems Software for TRS-80. It is the second game in the Continuum series, following Deathmaze 5000.

Contents
Labyrinth is a game where the player travels through a maze looking for clues and tools to help kill the Minotaur.

Reception
J. Mishcon reviewed Labyrinth in The Space Gamer No. 38. Mishcon commented that "This is truly one of the best adventure games by any criteria. At [the price] it borders on unbelievable. Believe it. Buy it."

References

External links
Review in 80 Micro

1980 video games
TRS-80 games
TRS-80-only games
Adventure games
Video games based on Greek mythology
Video games developed in the United States